Arthur P. Bochner (born July 1945) is an American communication scholar known for his research and teaching on intimate relationships, qualitative inquiry, narrative, and autoethnography.  He holds the rank of Distinguished University Professor at the University of South Florida. Bochner is the former President of the National Communication Association and former Vice-President of the Society for the Study of Symbolic Interaction. Among his publications are two books, two edited collections, and more than 100 book articles, chapters, and essays on communication theory, family and interpersonal communication, love and marriage, and the philosophies and methodologies of the human sciences, especially narrative inquiry and autoethnography.

Awards 
In 2015, Coming to Narrative was honored with a "Best Book" Award by the International Congress for Qualitative Inquiry.

In 2014, Bochner earned the National Communication Association Ethnography Division “Best Book Award” and “Legacy Award” for distinguished lifetime achievement in ethnography.

Awards in his name 
The Arthur P. Bochner Award is given annually to the top doctoral student in Communication at the University of South Florida.

Selected publications 
Bochner, A. (2014). Coming to Narrative: A Personal History of Paradigm Change in the Human Sciences. Walnut Creek, CA: Left Coast Press.

Bochner, A., & Riggs, N. (2014). Practicing narrative inquiry. In P. Leavy (Ed.), Handbook of Qualitative Methods (pp. 195–222). New York: Oxford University Press.

Bochner, A. (1997). It’s About Time: Narrative and the Divided Self. Qualitative Inquiry, 3, 418-438.

References 

Living people
American social scientists
Communication scholars
American non-fiction writers
American ethnographers
Positivists
Scientists from Pittsburgh
Syracuse University alumni
Bowling Green State University alumni
University of South Florida people
1945 births